Bolton Point is a suburb of the City of Lake Macquarie in New South Wales, Australia, and is located northeast of Toronto on a peninsula extending southwards into western Lake Macquarie.

References

External links
 History of Bolton Point (Lake Macquarie City Library)

Suburbs of Lake Macquarie